Hardell is a surname. Notable people with the surname include:
 Lennart Hardell (born 1944), Swedish oncologist
 William Hardell (born 1100s), Mayor of London